Heterobranchus bidorsalis, the African catfish or eel-like fattyfin catfish, is an airbreathing catfish found in Africa. It is closely related to the vundu catfish, which is well-known among fishermen.

Description
The head of  Heterobranchus bidorsalis is shaped like an oval and has a rectangular dorsum. The snout is round and the eyes are lateral. The frontal fontanelle is long and narrow while the occipital fontanelle is relatively long and is shaped like an oval. The postorbital bones are completely united. The suprabranchial organ is well developed. The pectoral spine is smooth. The body and fins may have spots. It can reach a length of 150 cm (59.0 inches) TL. The maximum recorded weight for this species is 30.0 kg. The species has 40-46 dorsal (in the back) soft rays, 49-58 anal soft rays, and 62-63 vertebrate.

Relationship to humans 
This fish is commercially fished for human consumption.

In studies on the effects of pollution on this fish it was shown to be tolerant to acute levels of agrolyser (a type of fertilizer), however a high concentration of anthracene in the liver can kill the catfish.

Studies into artificial spawning in this species showed that spawning can be induced in females by single intramuscular hormone injections of carp pituitary suspensions. An 82% survival rate of the larvae was achieved.

Habitat and distribution
This catfish is a demersal fish and inhabits freshwater. It lives in waters of 22.0-28.0 °C (71.6-82.4 °F). It is found widely in the northern half of Africa between Senegal and Ethiopia, as well as the Nile. It can be found in the Niger River, Gambia River, Senegal River, Baro River, Benue River, Volta River and Lake Chad.

References

Fish of Africa
Clariidae
Fish described in 1809
Taxa named by Étienne Geoffroy Saint-Hilaire